Li Xin (born July 31, 1992) is a Chinese cross-country skier who has competed since 2007. She finished 65th in the 10 km event at the 2010 Winter Olympics in Vancouver, British Columbia, Canada. She competed at the 2022 Winter Olympics, in Women's 10 kilometre classical, Women's 30 kilometre freestyle, Women's 15 kilometre skiathlon, and Women's 4 × 5 kilometre relay.

She finished second in the 5 km qualification event at the FIS Nordic World Ski Championships 2009 in Liberec, Czech Republic. This allowed Li to qualify for the 10 km event the following day where she finished 55th though her best finish at those same championships was 38th in the 30 km event.

Li's best World Cup finish was 24th in a 10 km event at Changchun in 2007.

References

1992 births
Chinese female cross-country skiers
Cross-country skiers at the 2010 Winter Olympics
Cross-country skiers at the 2018 Winter Olympics
Cross-country skiers at the 2022 Winter Olympics
Living people
Olympic cross-country skiers of China
Asian Games medalists in cross-country skiing
Cross-country skiers at the 2011 Asian Winter Games
Cross-country skiers at the 2017 Asian Winter Games
Asian Games silver medalists for China
Asian Games bronze medalists for China
Medalists at the 2011 Asian Winter Games
Medalists at the 2017 Asian Winter Games